Agustín Calderón (born February 27, 1972) is a Spanish sprint canoer who competed in the mid-1990s. At the 1996 Summer Olympics in Atlanta, he finished fifth the K-1 1000 m event.

References

Agustín Calderon's profile at Sports Reference.com

1972 births
Living people
Canoeists at the 1996 Summer Olympics
Olympic canoeists of Spain
Spanish male canoeists
Place of birth missing (living people)
20th-century Spanish people